Gangshiqia Peak is a  high mountain peak in the eastern Qilian Mountains of northeastern Qinghai province.  The mountain is located within Menyuan Hui Autonomous County of Haibei Prefecture, and is not far from the Gansu border. Ganshiqia is the highest peak in the Lenglong Ling (subrange) of the Qilian Mountains. Its southern slopes are drained by the Datong River and tributaries, while its northern slopes are drained by the Dongda He, an endorheic river terminating in Gansu near Jinchang.

The mountain possesses a popular climbing route via its glaciers, although Menyuan County is closed to foreigners without a permit.

References

Mountains of Qinghai
Haibei Tibetan Autonomous Prefecture